Shari Eubank (born June 12, 1947) is a retired American actress, best known for her starring role in the Russ Meyer film Supervixens.

Biography
Eubank was born in Albuquerque, New Mexico on June 12, 1947.  The following year, her family moved east to Farmer City, Illinois.  Eubank attended Farmer City High School, where she was a cheerleader and homecoming queen.  After graduating from high school in 1965, Eubank studied at Illinois Wesleyan University and became a member of the Masquers—a student drama organization.  Graduate work followed, before she began a modeling and acting career that included two feature films.

Meyer, who said "she had real guts", said she inherited a great deal of money from her family.

Filmography
 Supervixens (1975), SuperAngel/SuperVixen
 Chesty Anderson, USN (1976), Chesty Anderson

References

External links
 

1947 births
Living people
Actresses from Albuquerque, New Mexico
Actresses from New Mexico
Illinois Wesleyan University alumni
People from Farmer City, Illinois
21st-century American women